The Genesis Convention Center is a 7,000-seat multi-purpose arena located in Gary, Indiana, United States. It was home to the Gary Splash of the Independent Basketball Association from 2010 to 2013. It was also formerly home to the Gary Steelheads basketball team and had held the Miss USA pageant twice, in 2001 and 2002.

Attached to the arena is Indiana Hall, which was used as a theater and ballroom seating up to 1,200 for small concerts, plays, banquets and other special events.

References

External links 
 

Basketball venues in Indiana
Sports venues in Indiana
Indoor arenas in Indiana
Convention centers in Indiana
Sports in Gary, Indiana
Buildings and structures in Gary, Indiana
1981 establishments in Indiana
Sports venues completed in 1981
Continental Basketball Association venues